The Hayes Manufacturing Company Limited was a Vancouver-based Canadian manufacturer of heavy trucks known for their durability and a revolving bunk system.  Founded in 1920, Hayes built both highway and off-road trucks, particularly for the logging industry. On a smaller scale, Hayes also manufactured buses.  The Signal Company acquired a controlling stake in the company in 1969, and in 1971 renamed it Hayes Trucks. In 1975,  Signal sold the company to  Paccar, which closed the Hayes plants.

History

The Hayes Manufacturing Company was established in British Columbia in 1920 by Douglas Hayes, a parts dealer, and partner W. Anderson from Quadra Island, and was originally the Hayes-Anderson Motor Company Ltd. It was renamed Hayes Manufacturing Company Ltd. in 1928, when the company built a large factory on the False Creek flats in Vancouver.  The company eventually had over 600 employees and three plants.

Along with trucks, Hayes manufactured buses, moving vans, tractors and trailers.  Its few bus models included the Hayes "Teardrop", a very streamlined design introduced in 1936.  Several Teardrop buses were purchased by Pacific Stage Lines, one of which has been preserved by the Transit Museum Society.

The truck hood ornament was a die-cast, chrome-plated, 5-pound bear or a bronze cast bear. The chrome bear was found on the clippers and the bronze was off the square nose logger with butterfly wings. There was also a small bear ornament on each door.

The Signal Company, the parent firm of Mack Trucks, acquired a controlling share in Hayes Manufacturing in 1969.  The company was renamed Hayes Trucks in 1971.  In 1975,  Signal sold the company to  Paccar, which closed the Hayes plants.

Hayes logging
In addition to operating the truck company, the founder's son, Donald Hayes, continued and expanded family logging operations, establishing Hayes Forest Services Limited in 1956. In 2006, Donald P. Hayes, President, and grandson of the founder, proudly accepted the award for being one of Canada's 50 Best Managed Companies - Public or Private.

See also
Pacific Trucks
Challenger trucks

References

External links

Hayes trucks Club

Defunct truck manufacturers
Defunct bus manufacturers
Manufacturing companies based in Vancouver
Vehicle manufacturing companies established in 1920
Vehicle manufacturing companies disestablished in 1975
1920 establishments in British Columbia
1975 disestablishments in British Columbia
Bus manufacturers of Canada
Truck manufacturers of Canada
Canadian companies disestablished in 1975
Canadian companies established in 1920